Davahchi-ye Sofla (also Romanized as Davahchī-ye Soflá; also known as Davechī-ye Pā'īn and Davehchī) is a village in Arshaq-e Gharbi Rural District, Moradlu District, Meshgin Shahr County, Ardabil Province, Iran. At the 2006 census, its population was 159, in 36 families.

References 

Towns and villages in Meshgin Shahr County